River Ridge High School is a 6A high school in Woodstock, Georgia, United States.  It is located at 400 Arnold Mill Road, Woodstock, Georgia 30188. 

The school's athletic teams are known as the Knights.

References

External links 
 http://cherokeek12.net/riverridgehs

Public high schools in Georgia (U.S. state)
Schools in Cherokee County, Georgia
2009 establishments in Georgia (U.S. state)
Educational institutions established in 2009